Măstăcani is a commune in Galați County, Western Moldavia, Romania with a population of 5,144 people. It is composed of two villages, Chiraftei and Măstăcani.

References

Communes in Galați County
Localities in Western Moldavia
Populated places on the Prut